Norman Joseph Andrew Beaudin (born November 28, 1941) is a Canadian former professional ice hockey forward who played 25 games in the National Hockey League and 335 in the World Hockey Association, most notably for the Winnipeg Jets.  He also played for the Minnesota North Stars and St. Louis Blues. He owned two hockey stores in Florida.

Minor leagues
After a four-year junior career, principally with the Regina Pats of the Saskatchewan Junior Hockey League, that saw him play for the Memorial Cup in 1961 (with the Pats) and 1962 (with the Edmonton Oil Kings), Beaudin signed with the Montreal Canadiens organization, playing in 1963 with their farm team in Hull-Ottawa.  The following year saw him claimed in the waiver draft by the Detroit Red Wings organization, where he spent the next four seasons, mostly with their Pittsburgh Hornets and Memphis Wings farm teams.  In 1967, he was claimed by the Blues in the expansion draft, and made his NHL debut in that season, while spending most of the season with the Blues' Kansas City affiliate.  He was loaned to the American Hockey League Buffalo Bisons in 1968, and subsequently played the next three seasons for the Cleveland Barons of the AHL.  In that time, his rights were traded to the North Stars, for whom he played 12 games in the 1971 season.

WHA career
Beaudin was the first player signed by the Jets, and played on a line with superstar Bobby Hull and centre Christian Bordeleau in the Jets' inaugural season.  He had his best pro season by far, as all three members of the line scored over 100 points; Beaudin contributed 38 goals and 65 assists for 103 points, and was named to play in the WHA's first All-Star Game in 1973.  He led the WHA playoffs in scoring that year with a sparkling 13 goals and 15 assists as the Jets lost to the New England Whalers in the league finals, highlighted by a seven-point game against the Minnesota Fighting Saints.

Beaudin's production dropped sharply the next season, and in 1974 he and Bordeleau were replaced as Hull's linemates by Swedish stars Anders Hedberg and Ulf Nilsson.  After the Jets' AVCO World Trophy championship in 1976, Beaudin signed with Swiss team SC Langnau, with whom he played for two seasons before retiring.

Achievements and facts
Beaudin finished his WHA career with 97 goals and 155 assists for 252 points in 309 games, adding 37 points in 31 playoff games.  He also had one goal and two assists in 25 NHL games.

External links 
 

1941 births
Canadian ice hockey forwards
Cincinnati Wings players
Edmonton Oil Kings (WCHL) players
Ice hockey people from Saskatchewan
Living people
Minnesota North Stars players
St. Louis Blues players
Winnipeg Jets (WHA) players